Helosis is a genus of flowering plants belonging to the family Balanophoraceae.

Its native range is Peninsula Malaysia, Mexico to Tropical America.

Species:

Helosis antillensis 
Helosis cayennensis 
Helosis ruficeps

References

Balanophoraceae
Santalales genera